Fawaz Bakhit Al Ahmad  is a Kuwaiti former footballer who played as a midfielder. He played for Kuwait in the 1996 Asian Cup. He also played for Kazma

External links

1969 births
Kuwaiti footballers
Kuwait international footballers
Kazma SC players
Association football midfielders
Living people
Olympic footballers of Kuwait
Footballers at the 1992 Summer Olympics
Asian Games bronze medalists for Kuwait
Asian Games medalists in football
Footballers at the 1994 Asian Games
Medalists at the 1994 Asian Games
Kuwait Premier League players